Zamani (also Romanized as Zamānī; also known as Zamīni) is a village in Sedeh Rural District, Sedeh District, Qaen County, South Khorasan Province, Iran. At the 2006 census, its population was 122, in 52 families.

References 

Populated places in Qaen County